León, Spain can mean:

León (province), Spain
León, León, capital of the León province in Spain
Kingdom of León (historical)